Next of Kin is a 1984 film directed by Atom Egoyan. It is Egoyan's first feature film and won two prizes at the International Filmfestival Mannheim-Heidelberg and was nominated for Best Achievement in Direction at the 8th Genie Awards.

Plot summary
Twenty-three-year-old Peter Foster is an only child who lives at home, where he constantly hears his parents arguing.  Because Peter does nothing all day, the family goes to a clinic where a therapist videotapes them.  After Peter watches his tape, he views the tape of a troubled Armenian family, who gave their only son away for adoption when they arrived in Canada.  Peter decides to visit this family, and he pretends to be their son, Bedros Deryan.  The Deryan family welcomes him with open arms, and Peter tries to patch up the poor relationship between George Deryan and his daughter Azah.

Cast

DVD release
Next of Kin was first made commercially available via a DVD set along with Egoyan's second full-length film, Family Viewing. It was also released in the U.K. in BD and DVD by Curzon Artificial Eye.

References

External links

1984 films
Canadian drama films
1980s English-language films
English-language Canadian films
1984 drama films
Films about adoption
Films directed by Atom Egoyan
1984 directorial debut films
1980s Canadian films